Robert William Scribner (9 June 1941, in Sydney – 29 January 1998, in Arlington, Massachusetts) was an Australian historian.

Scribner held bachelor's and master's degrees from the University of Sydney. After writing his Ph.D. in 1970, he completed a study on the Reformation in Erfurt, published in Past & Present (University of London). His first teaching assignment followed at the Portsmouth Polytechnic. From 1979 to 1981 he taught at King's College London. Subsequently, Scribner taught as a fellow at Clare College, where he became one of the founders of early modern research, along with Patrick Collinson and Peter Burke. In 1996, he was appointed to the Department of Religious History at Harvard University. His main focus was the German-speaking Reformation. For academic teaching he translated many sources about the Peasants' War in Germany into English, concluding with The German Peasants' War. A history in documents (Humanities Press International, 1991).

Selected publications
 Robert W. Scribner. For the sake of simple folk. Popular propaganda for the German Reformation ( Cambridge studies in oral and literate culture. Bd. 2). Cambridge University Press, Cambridge 1981, .
 Robert W. Scribner (ed. Lyndal Roper). Religion and culture in Germany (1400-1800). Leiden : Brill, 2001. 186504235; German edition: Religion und Kultur in Deutschland 1400-1800 (Veröffentlichungen des Max-Planck-Instituts für Geschichte. Bd. 175). Herausgegeben von Lyndal Roper. 2. Auflage, Vandenhoeck & Ruprecht, Göttingen 2006, .
 Robert W Scribner. The reformation in national context. Cambridge [u.a.] Cambridge Univ. Press 1998 833681692
 Robert W Scribner. The reformation in national context. Cambridge [u.a.] Cambridge Univ. Press 1998 833681692
 Robert W Scribner. Popular culture and popular movements in reformation Germany, London ; Ronceverte, WV : Hambledon Press, 1988. 181822124
 Robert W Scribner. The German Reformation. London : Macmillan, 1986. OCLC 59093285
 with Sheilagh C. Ogilvie.  Germany: a new social and economic history. Volume 1, 1450–1630. London ; New York ; Sydney : A. Arnold, 1996. 468817585
 with Sheilagh Ogilvie; R  J Overy. Germany : a new social and economic history. London ; New York : Arnold, 1996-2003. 602992252
 with Trevor Johnson (co-eds.). Popular religion in Germany and central Europe, 1400–1800.  Basingstoke : St. Martin's Press, 1996. 59093285
 with  C. Scott Dixon, The German Reformation.  Basingstoke, Hampshire ; New York : Palgrave Macmillan, 2003. 52121514
 with Lyndal Roper. Religion and culture in Germany (1400-1800), Leiden : Brill, 2001.  186504235
 with Gerhard Benecke The German Peasant War 1525. New Viewpoints. George Allen & Unwin, London u. a. 1979, .
 with Ronnie Po-Chia Hsia. Problems in the historical anthropology of early modern Europe. (Wolfenbütteler Forschungen; Bd. 78.) Wiesbaden: Harrassowitz, 1997. .

References
Citations

Sources
Peter Blickle: Nekrolog Robert William Scribner 1941–1998. In: Historische Zeitschrift. Band 281, 2005, S. 547–549.
Thomas A. Brady, Jr.: Robert William („Bob“) Scribner (1941–1998). In: Central European History.'' Bd. 31, Nr 3, 1998, S. 293–296 (online)
 

1941 births
1998 deaths
20th-century Australian historians